Tod Bowman, (born March 29, 1965) is a Democratic politician and legislator from the state of Iowa. He was elected to the Iowa Senate in 2010. He represents District 29, which holds Clinton, Dubuque, and Jackson counties.

Early life and education
Bowman is a graduate of Maquoketa Community High School in 1983. Senator Bowman then enrolled at Luther College where he went to receive his B.A. in Social Sciences. Bowman later went on to attain a Master of Education from Western Illinois University. After receiving his degree, Bowman taught Political Science, Psychology, and Sociology at Maquoketa High School and Clinton Community College. Bowman also taught high school wrestling and continues to coach football in the school district. Bowman now teaches Government at the high school and Clinton Community College on the high school's campus. He also is an active member of the First Lutheran Church of Maquoketa.

Iowa Senate
Bowman was first elected in 2010, defeating Republican Andrew Naeve. Bowman was the chair of the Senate Transportation Committee. He also served on the Agriculture, Education, Economic Growth and State Government committees, as well as the Transportation, Infrastructure, and Capitals Appropriations Budget Subcommittee (Vice Chair). He was defeated in the election of November 2018 by Republican opponent Carrie Koelker.

References

Luther College (Iowa) alumni
Western Illinois University alumni
Democratic Party Iowa state senators
1965 births
Living people
People from Maquoketa, Iowa
21st-century American politicians